Jessica Fox may refer to:

Jessica Fox (actress) (born 1983), British actress
Jessica Fox (canoeist) (born 1994), French-born, Australian Olympic slalom canoer